Derek Smith (born July 17, 1980 in Hopkinsville, Kentucky) is a retired American soccer player who last played for the Cincinnati Kings in the USL Premier Development League.

Career

College and amateur
Smith attended Hopkinsville High School before playing soccer at Union College(KY) from 2000 to 2003. He was named the team Defensive Man of the Year and Most Valuable Player in 2002 and an All-American Honorable Mention selection and First Team All-Region in both 2001 and 2002. In 2001 and 2002, he spent the collegiate off season with the West Michigan Edge of the fourth division Premier Development League.

Professional
Undrafted out of college, Smith played for the Cocoa Expos of the PDL in the summer of 2004, before signing his first professional contract with the Virginia Beach Mariners of the USL First Division. In 2005, he signed with the Columbus Crew of Major League Soccer, and although he saw no time with the first team, he played two games with the reserves.

After being released by the Crew, Smith joined the Cincinnati Kings of the PDL, and played for them for two years.  On February 17, 2007, the Minnesota Thunder announced the signing of Smith to a two-year contract. He played 12 games for Minnesota in 2007. Smith suffered a double sports hernia injury in the 2008 season. Smith returned for his second stint with the Cincinnati Kings in the PDL in 2009–2010.

Coaching
Smith also coaches for the Blackhawks of St. Paul U15 C1 girls which he helped to get to state, and the Saint Paul Academy and Summit School Boys JV team, which he coached to a record of 10-6 and 48 goals scored.  On April 21, 2006, the College of Mount St. Joseph hired Smith as an assistant with both the men's and women's soccer teams.

References

External links
 Minnesota Thunder Player Profile (archived link as of 26th of August 2016 due to the broken original Link)

1980 births
Living people
American soccer coaches
American soccer players
West Michigan Edge players
Cocoa Expos players
Virginia Beach Mariners players
Columbus Crew players
Cincinnati Kings players
Minnesota Thunder players
USL First Division players
USL League Two players
Soccer players from Kentucky
Union College (Kentucky) alumni
Mount St. Joseph University
Association football defenders